Dharhara may refer to:
 Dharhara, Bhagalpur, in Bhagalpur district of Bihar
 Dharhara (community development block), in Munger district of Bihar